Headcleaner is a sixteen track compilation album from Australian alternative rockers, the Lime Spiders, issued in 1988 through Virgin Records. It Compiled all of Lime Spiders singles and B-Sides up to that point in time, Together in a single package.It was initially released on music cassette before being appearing on vinyl LP (1989) and CD formats.

Reception

Track listing

Credits

Lime Spiders
 Mick Blood – lead vocals
 Gerard Corben – guitar
 Tony Bambach – bass guitar
 Richard Lawson – drums
 Richard Jakimyszyn – guitar
 Darryl Mather – guitar
 Stephen Rawle – drums

Production work
 Cameron Allan – producer (tracks: 9, 10)
 David Price – producer (tracks: 11, 12)
 Lime Spiders – producer (tracks: 2, 3, 6, 7)
 Tom Misner – producer (tracks: 2, 3, 6, 7)
 Rob Younger – producer (tracks: 1, 4, 5, 8)

References

1987 compilation albums
Lime Spiders albums